Third Street AleWorks is a brewery and brewpub in downtown Santa Rosa, California, USA, which opened in 1996.  Amongst the award-winning beers produced at Third Street AleWorks is the Blarney Sister's Dry Irish Stout, which has won numerous awards, including several golds.

Awards

Annadel Pale Ale 
2nd Place 2003 LA County Fair Craft Beer Competition (English Pale Ale)
Gold 2002 Great American Beer Festival (English Pale Ale)
Gold 2002 World Beer Cup (English Pale Ale)  
Bronze 2001 Great American Beer Festival (English Pale Ale)

Stonefly Oatmeal Stout 
Silver 2002 World Beer Cup (Oatmeal Stout)
1st PLace 2002 California State Fair Craft Brew Competition (Stout)
3rd Place 2001 California State Fair Craft Brew Competition
2nd Place 2001 San Diego Real Ale Festival (Dark Ales) Cask Ales

Bodega Head IPA 
3rd Place 1998 California State Fair Craft Brew Competition (IPA)

Blarney Sister's Dry Irish Stout 
Bronze 2007 Great American Beer Festival (Classic Irish Style Dry Stout)
Silver 2004 World Beer Cup (Dry Stout)
Gold 2003 Great American Beer Festival (Dry Stout)
Gold 2003 Real Ale Festival (Dry Stout) Bottle Conditioned Category
Silver "Best of Show" 2003 Real Ale Festival
3rd Place 2003 LA County Fair Craft Brew Competition (Dry Stout)
Gold 2002 Great American Beer Festival (Dry Stout)
Gold 2002 World Beer Cup (Dry Stout)

One Tone Blackberry Ale 
1st Place "Best of Show" 2004 El Dorado Craft Beer Competition
1st Place 2004 El Dorado Casino Craft Beer Competition
3rd Place 2003 LA County Fair Craft Brew Competition (Fruit)
1st Place "Best of Show" 2002 El Dorado Casino Craft Beer Competition
1st Place  2002 El Dorado Casino Craft Beer Competition
2nd Place 2002 California State Fair Craft Brew Competition
Bronze 2001 Great American Beer Festival (Fruit Beers)
2nd Place 1999 California State Fair Craft Brew Competition
1st Place 1998 California State Fair Craft Brew Competition

See also
 California breweries

References

External links
 Official website 

Beer brewing companies based in the San Francisco Bay Area
Companies based in Santa Rosa, California